Euphyllia paraglabrescens is a species of large-polyped stony coral belonging to the Euphylliidae family. The International Union for Conservation of Nature has listed it as a vulnerable species, stating "its threat susceptibility increases the likelihood of being lost within one generation."

Description
Colonies of Euphyllia paraglabrescens are almost identical to those of Euphyllia glabrescens with short, bubble-like tentacles that extend at night with cnidocytes.

Distribution and habitat
It is the dominant species of Ôjioya Port, Tanegashima, Japan, the only place where this species has been found.

Euphyllia paraglabrescens attaches to sandstone rock in shallow water at depths of 5 – 15 meters.

References 

Euphylliidae
Animals described in 1990